Andrew Jackson Bumatai (born December 24, 1953) is an American actor, stand-up comedian, television host and producer from Hawaii. He is of Native Hawaiian, Filipino, French and German ancestry.

Early life 
Bumatai was born in Germany to a German mother and an American military father. He lived in San Francisco for much of his childhood and moved to Kalihi at the age of 13. After a year in Kalihi, he and family then moved to Waianae. His brother was actor Ray Bumatai, who died on October 2, 2005.

In 11th grade, Bumatai dropped out of Waianae High School and worked odd jobs. He eventually became a successful salesman by his early 20s. Later on, he decided to become a stand-up comedian as there was a shortage of them in Hawaii.

Bumatai began his career by searching for venues to perform at. He initially struggled finding work as venues generally preferred musical entertainers over comedic ones. He eventually was hired and started opening for popular Hawaiian comedian Frank De Lima and soon found himself replacing the late Rap Reiplinger in Booga Booga, Hawaii's seminal sketch comedy group. He went on to perform stand-up comedy extensively on the mainland and in Hawaii.

Career 
Bumatai recorded a number of comedy albums. His first won a Hoku award for "Most Promising Artist" and he went on to win three more for "Best Comedy Performance."

Bumatai also created a number of TV specials for Hawaii's KGMB-TV, notably High School Daze and All in the Ohana. He and his brother, Ray Bumatai also created a show titled BumaVision for Hawaii's OC16 network. Nationally, he was featured on Raven and has had roles on North Shore and Baywatch among others. Bumatai also co-starred in a 1997 pilot for a new Hawaii Five-O series, which never made it to air.

Not coincidentally, Bumatai's character's name in Steven Cannell productions (Raven, Five-O, Marker) is always the same: Danny Kahala.

Bumatai is currently executive producer of Nighttime Productions, and produces and stars in his own Hawaii-based online talk show, The Andy Bumatai Show.

He is also the host of Toolin' Around, a series on motorbikes, and The Daily Pidgin, a show that talks about the Hawaiian Pidgin language and local Hawaii customs. Both of these are uploaded on his YouTube channel.

Works credited, stage appearances, and filmography

External links
AndyBumatai.com

Hoku Awards - Comedy Albums

References

Male actors from Hawaii
American stand-up comedians
Living people
Place of birth missing (living people)
1953 births
Na Hoku Hanohano Award winners
20th-century American comedians
21st-century American comedians
Comedians from Hawaii
Hawaii people of Filipino descent
American people of German descent
American people of French descent
Native Hawaiian people